Klock Site is an archaeological site located at Ephratah in Fulton County, New York.  It is also known as Las. 8-4, New York State Office of Parks, Recreation, and Historic Preservation Unique Site No. A035-04-0005.  It is one of three Mohawk Indian village sites excavated by archaeologist Robert E. Funk in 1969-1970.

The site has been dated to 1540–1565.

It was listed on the National Register of Historic Places in 1980.

References

Archaeological sites on the National Register of Historic Places in New York (state)
Fulton County, New York
Iroquois populated places
Former Native American populated places in the United States
Mohawk tribe
Native American history of New York (state)
National Register of Historic Places in Fulton County, New York